Joseph Alvin Neisendorfer (born April 22, 1945 in Chicago) is an American mathematician known for his work in homotopy theory, an area of algebraic topology. He is a Fellow of the American Mathematical Society.

Education and career
Neisendorfer earned his bachelor's degree in 1967 from the University of Chicago. He earned his master's degree in 1968 and his doctorate in 1972 from Princeton University, working under the direction of John Coleman Moore.

In 1972 he began working as an assistant professor at the University of Notre Dame, then in 1976 at Syracuse University, and then in 1978 at Fordham University. In 1980–1981 he worked at the Institute for Advanced Study after which he became an associate professor at Ohio State University. He served as a professor at the University of Rochester from 1985 until his retirement in 2011, serving as department chair from 1994 to 1996.

During his tenure as the department chair, the University of Rochester experienced severe financial challenges which led to significant restructuring entitled the Rochester Renaissance Plan. In November 1995, the mathematics department was told by the University of Rochester administration that the doctoral program was slated for removal and that the departmental faculty slated for significant downsizing, and admissions to the University of Rochester doctoral program in Mathematics were suspended. This decision led to the involvement of the American Mathematical Society, who passed a resolution urging Rochester to reconsider and formed a task force (chaired by Arthur Jaffe) to address the issue. After a fact-finding committee organized by Neisendorfer sent their report to the university administration, the doctoral program in mathematics was restored.

Publications

References 

1945 births
Living people
20th-century American mathematicians
University of Chicago alumni
Princeton University alumni
University of Rochester faculty
Fellows of the American Mathematical Society
Topologists
University of Notre Dame faculty
Syracuse University faculty
Ohio State University faculty
Institute for Advanced Study people
Mathematicians from Illinois
Scientists from Chicago
21st-century American mathematicians